The military history of Croatia encompasses wars, battles and all military actions fought on the territory of modern Croatia and the military history of the Croat people regardless of political geography.

Medieval Croatian states

Croatian principalities 

The first mention of Croatian military actions dates from the time of the Croatian principalities in the 8th and 9th centuries. Vojnomir led a Croatian army in wars against the Avars at the end of the 8th century. He launched a joint counterattack with the help of Frankish troops under Charlemagne in 791. The offensive was successful and the Avars were driven out of what then became Lower Pannonia under Frankish overlords. In 819, his successor Duke Ljudevit Posavski raised a rebellion against the Franks. Ljudevit won many battles against the Franks, but in 822 his forces were defeated. Prince Borna of Croatia led the army of Dalmatian Croatia and had a primary role in crushing Ljudevit's rebellion. Borna reported his successes to the Frankish Emperor, stating that Ljudevit had lost over 3,000 soldiers and 300 horses during his campaign. Prince Trpimir I of Croatia battled successfully against his neighbours, the Byzantine coastal cities under the strategos of Zadar in 846–848. In 853 he repulsed an attack from an Army of the Bulgarian Khan Boris I and concluded a peace treaty with him, exchanging gifts.
Prince Domagoj of Croatia is known in the history for his navy which helped the Franks to conquer Bari from the Arabs in 871. During Domagoj's reign piracy was a common practice, which earned him a title of The worst duke of Slavs.
One of the strongest Croatian princes was Branimir, whose naval fleet defeated the Venetian navy on 18 September 887.

Kingdom of Croatia
First Croatian king Tomislav defeated the Magyar mounted invasions of the Arpads in battle and forced them across the Drava River. In 927 Tomislav's army heavily defeated the army of Bulgarian Emperor Simeon, under the command of general Alogobotur in the Battle of the Bosnian Highlands. One of Tomislav's admirals lead more than 5,000 sailors, soldiers and their families into Slavic quarter of Palermo, Sicily. At the peak of his reign, according to Byzantine emperor Constantine VII Porphyrogenitos' De Administrando Imperio, written around 950, Tomislav could raise a vast military force composed out of 100,000 infantrymen and 60,000 horsemen and a sizable fleet of 80 large ships and 100 smaller vessels. According to the palaeographic analysis of the original manuscript of De Administrando Imperio, the estimation of the number of inhabitants in medieval Croatia between 440 and 880 thousand people, and military numbers of Franks and Byzantines - the Croatian military force was most probably composed of 20,000-100,000 infantrymen, and 3,000-24,000 horsemen organized in 60 allagions. but these numbers are generally taken as a considerable exaggeration.

King Dmitar Zvonimir of Croatia took the hard line against the Byzantine Empire and joined the Normans in wars against Byzantium. When Robert Guiscard, Duke of Apulia, invaded the western Balkan provinces of the empire in 1084, Zvonimir sent troops to his aid.

King Petar Svačić's troops maintained resistance against repelling Hungarian assaults at Mount Gvozd in the war for the succession of the Croatian throne. At the end, the last native Croatian king was defeated and killed by King Coloman of Hungary in the Battle of Gvozd Mountain (1097).

Notable wars and battles of early and high medieval times
Notable wars and battles that included Croatian army:
Siege of Trsat (799)
Battle of Kupa (819)
Battle of Drava River (925) 
Croatian-Bulgarian wars
Battle of the Bosnian Highlands (926)

Battle of Gvozd Mountain (1097)
Siege of Zadar (1202) – part of Fourth Crusade
Fifth Crusade (1213–1221)
Battle of Klis Fortress (1242) – part of Mongol invasion of Europe
Battle of Grobnik field (1242)
Zadar-Venice War (1311-1312)
Battle of Bliska (1322)
Louis I of Hungary's Dalmatian Campaign
Battle of Samobor (1441)

Croatian-Ottoman Wars (15th–18th centuries)

Early confrontations 

 Battle of Una (1483)
 Battle of Vrpile Gulch (1491)

Hundred Years' Croatian–Ottoman War 

Battle of Krbava field (1493)
Battle of Dubica (1513)
Siege of Klis (1524)
Siege of Jajce (1524)
Battle of Mohács (1526)
Hungarian campaign of 1527–1528
Balkan campaign of 1529
Siege of Vienna (1529)
Little War in Hungary (1530 – c.1552)
 Siege of Varaždin (1527)
Siege of Güns (1532)
Katzianer's Campaign (1537)
Battle of Szigetvár (1566)
Siege of Gvozdansko (1577–1578)
Battle of Brest (1592)
Battle of Sisak (1593)

Long War (1593–1606) 

Battle of Brest (1596)

Austro-Turkish War (1663–1664) 

First Battle of Novi Zrin (1663)
Battle at Jurjeve Stijene (1663)
Second Battle of Novi Zrin (1663)
Nikola Zrinski's Winter Campaign (1664)
Battle of Krapina (1664)
Third Battle of Novi Zrin (1664)
Battle of Saint Gotthard (1664)

Great Turkish War (1683–1699) 

Siege of Virovitica (1684)
Osijek Campaign (1685)
Siege of Buda (1686)
Battle of Mohács (1687) - resulted in liberation of Osijek
Battle of Požega (1688)
Lika Campaign (1688)
Siege of Knin (1688)
Siege of Udbina Castle (1689)
Battle of Velika Monastery (1690)
Battle of Osijek (1690)
Battle of Slankamen (1691)
Siege of Bihać (1697)
Battle of Zenta (1697)

Gallery of images from Croatian-Ottoman Wars

18th Century Wars 
Siege of Sinj (1715)
Battle of Petrovaradin (1716)
Battle of Saint Gotthard (1705)

Other Wars 

 Siege of Sokolac (1493) - struggle between authority of Croatian ban and Anž Frankopan over control of Senj.
 First Revolt against Franjo Tahy
 Croatian-Slovene Peasant Revolt

Historic units and formations originating from the time of the Ottoman wars:

 Military Frontier
 Haramije
 Grenz infantry
 Uskoci
 Pandurs
 Royal Cravattes

19th century
At the beginning of the 19th century many Croatian troops (as a part of the Austrian imperial army) fought in the Napoleonic Wars against the French Grande Armée. 
Later, a significant Croatian force (four regiments) fought on the French side during Napoleon's invasion of Russia.

At the end of the first half of the 19th century, following in the wake of the French revolution, Croatian romantic nationalism emerged to counteract the non-violent but apparent Germanization and Magyarization. By the 1840s, and during the revolutions of 1848, the movement had moved from cultural goals to resisting Hungarian political demands which grew even bigger during the Hungarian Revolution of 1848. Croatian Ban Josip Jelačić cooperated with the Austrians in quenching the Hungarian Revolution of 1848 by leading a military campaign into Hungary.

Battles of the Hungarian Revolution involving Croats:
Battle of Pákozd (1848)
Vienna Uprising (1848)
Battle of Schwechat (1848)
Battle of Mór (1848)

Croatian troops also contributed in other conflicts which involved the Austrian Empire. According to the sources, out of 7,871 sailors on Austrian ships around 5,000 were Croats. Many Croatian sailors fought on the Austrian side in 1866 during Third Italian War of Independence in the Battle of Vis.

The territory of Military Frontier - a buffer zone along Habsburg-Ottoman border taken from Croatia back in the 16th century due to the Croatian-Ottoman Wars was demilitarized and in July 1873 and united with civil Croatia in 1881.

Formation of Royal Croatian Home Guard 

After reaching Croatian-Hungarian Settlement of 1868, Kingdom of Croatia-Slavonia gained limited authonomy in relation to Kingdom of Hungary. The settlement was a legal basis for creation of Royal Croatian Home Guard, a special detachment of Hungarian Honved where Croatian symbols, Croatian oath of allegiance and Croatian command language were in use. After restructuring of 1889-1899 Croatian Home Guard became part of the country's regular standing army. 

Standard weapon of 16th Croatian-Hungarian Infantry Regiment from Varaždin was 8mm Mannlicher M1895 bolt action rifle with bayonet. Soldiers had both parade uniforms and campaign uniforms. The latter ones consisted of grayish trousers, blouse, cap and greatcoats for cold weather.

When it comes to Hussar Home Guard Regiments, in 1914, they were armes with Mannlicher Cavalry Carabine and 87 cm long sabre. Cavalrymen also wore a distinctive hat (chako) with Lands of the Crown of Saint Stephen coat of armes, which includes Croatian, Dalmatian and Slavonian coat of arms and inscription written in Croatian: "for king and homeland" (Za kralja i domovinu).

Austro-Hungarian occupation of Bosnia and Herzegovina 

Croatian troops, including Home Guard units under command of baron Josip Filipović took part in Austro-Hungarian campaign in Bosnia and Herzegovina of 1878.

20th century

World War I

During World war I, Croat soldiers served in Royal Croatian Home Guard and other units. Some of notable Croatian commanders of that time were Field Marshal Svetozar Boroević, General Stjepan Sarkotić and Admiral Maximilian Njegovan.

Unlike the other fronts, Croats participating in World War I, were most motivated to fight on the Italian front, as Treaty of London (which brought Italy into World War I), promised large chunks of Croatian littoral to Italy. Secondly, unlike the other fronts, on Italian front Croats did not have to fight their "slavic brothers".

Notable battles of World War I that included Croatian troops:
Serbian Campaign (World War I) (1914)
Adriatic Campaign of World War I (1914–1918)
Battle of Galicia (1914)
Brusilov Offensive (1916)
Battle of Soča (1915)
Battle of Caporetto (1917)
Bombardment of Ancona (1915)
Battle of the Piave River (1918)
Battle of Vittorio Veneto (1918)
The end of World War I was followed by the dissolution of the Austro-Hungarian monarchy and the formation of new national states. The State of Slovenes, Croats and Serbs was formed from the southernmost parts of the Austria-Hungary but it lasted for only a month. 
After it was clear that Austria-Hungary had lost World War I, the Austrian government decided to give much of the Austro-Hungarian Navy fleet, to the newly formed State of Slovenes, Croats and Serbs. This move would have avoided handing the fleet to the Allies, since the new state had declared neutrality.
Soon, the Fleet was attacked and dismembered by the Italian Regia Marina and the flagship SMS Viribus Unitis was sunk along with his captain and commander of Navy of the newly formed state, admiral Janko Vuković.

World War I aftermath 

 1918 occupation of Međimurje

Interwar period 
Throughout the interwar period, the Royal Yugoslav Army was mostly Serb dominated institution, which discouraged Croatians from joining it. Major issue was Serbian tradition of corporal punishment, which was unknown in former Austro-Hungarian lands and which caused much resistance when introduced. Former Austro-Hungarian officers were ofter regarded as second-class officers, and often found themselves subordinated to much younger Serbs officers who were completely uneducated. Croatian officers often felt offended for being attacked on national basis.  In certain cases, officers were put to jail for not knowing how to write in Serbian Cyrillic script. This ethnic inequality in armed forces caused frequent desertions and occasional rebellions among Croatians in the army. Prior to World War II out of 165 generals only two were Croats, two were Slovenes, the rest were Serbs.

World War II

As Axis forces overran Kingdom of Yugoslavia in April War of 1941, Croatian fascists Ustaše under Gernan-Italian sponsorship arrived to Zagreb and proclaimed Independent State of Croatia (NDH). Almost immediately, Ustaše started a campaign of mass terror (and genocide) against large Serb population in NDH, as well as Jews, Romani and anti-fascist Croats. However, when Hitler started his Operation Barbarossa in June 1941, Croatian communists responded by launcing an uprising, thus giving Serbs of NDH a chance to escape  the Ustaše persecution by joining their ranks. To great annoyance of Germans, Ustaše continued their persecution which made the uprising grow ever bigger, forcing Germans to commit ever more tropps to quell it. While Serbs were forced to join communist People's Liberation Army of Yugoslavia (NOVJ) in order to save their lives, Croatians as a nation were divided between those supporting Axis in order to preserve what they perceived as their new state and those opposing Ustaše. Yugoslav communists who opposed pre-war Serb domination, also offered a federalized state to the Croats, thus creating a platform acceptable to both Serbs and Croats. However, when Ustaše gave away much of Dalmatia to Italian irredentists by agreeing to Treaties of Rome, their support among Croatians sank even lower, especially in Dalmatia which was given to Italy. As Croatian historian Dušan Bilandžić points out; throughout World War II, Croats as a nation were engaged in several wars at once. Firstly, they were engaged in a war against axis occupation. Secondly, they were engaged in a civil war between those Croats who are anti-fascist and those who are pro-axis. And thirdly, they were engaged in an inter-ethnic war between Croats and Serbs.   

In general, NDH units can be divided into two cattegories: firstly there were the Homeguards (Domobrani), which was a regular army of NDH consisting out of conscripted men with a low desire to fight. Besides them, there were also Ustaše militia (Ustaška vojnica) - an official paramilitary arm of Ustaša movement, virtually independent of regular army and mostly consisting of volunteers. In 1942, Ustaše government sent a detachment of its units to fight along Axis forces in Battle of Stalingrad.

Communist partisans continued to wage a guerilla war against Axis forces in the country. A major breaktrhough happened in September 1943, when fascist Italy capitulated which was a major impetus for Dalmatian Croats to join communist partisans as well as partisans who acquired large quantities of Italian weapon stocks. That same year, partisan uprising spread among Croats in Istria, however Germans considered Istrian peninsula too important in case of spaculated Allied landing on Eastern Adriatic, so Erwin Rommel was sent to Istria and his forces quashed the uprising by brute force.

Except for NOVJ and NDH loyal units, Greater Serbian Chetnik Royalist detachments also operated in the country committing massacres against non-Serb population.

As Allied forces prevailed over Axis, NOVJ became recognised as part of an Allied Coalition in Teheran conference of 1943. As ever more people joined their ranks, NOVJ guerilla warfare evolved into a full-fledged army – Jugoslavenska Armija (JA) by 1945. On the other hand, by 1944, NDH authorities were forced to merge their Ustaše militia with their regular Homeguard units into Croatian Armed Forces (HOS).  As war came to its end in Spring 1945, remnants of HOS units with Ustaša government pulled out towards the Austrian border to surrender to the Allies, however British who awaited them there insisted for HOS to surrender to JA. After the surrender, the HOS members along with many civilians who accompanied them were massacred in Bleiburg rapatriations.

Battles of World War II:
Invasion of Yugoslavia (1941)
Battle of Stalingrad (1942)
Battle of Neretva (1943)
Battle of Sutjeska (1943)
Battle on Lijevča field (1945)
Battle of Sarajevo (1945)
Battle of Odžak (1945)

Cold War 

 Trieste Crisis
 United Nations Emergency Force

Croatian War of Independence
In 1991, as Croatia proclaimed its intependance, tensions between new Croatian government on one side and Croatian Serbs militia backed by Yugoslav federal army (JNA) on the other escalated into Croatian War of Independence. With Croatian Territorial Defense (TO) weapons being locked by the Federal Army, Croatia saw urgent need to form its own armed forces. They did it by expanding its police force and then forming Croatian National Guard  (ZNG) subordinated to newly  formed Ministry of Defense. In September 1991, Croatian National Guard and Police blocked Yugoslav Federal Army's barracks throughout Croatia and in Battle of Barracks successfully forced JNA to withdraw from most of Croatia. By doing this Croatians successfully managed to get their hands on heavy weapons and most of its TO arsenal, especially after the capture of Varaždin barracks. In September 1991, Croatia also formed its general staff. Croatian troops at a time despite being well motivated, were just a "loosely organized and hastily trained" light infantry force supported with limited number ot tanks and artillery. On 3 November 1991 ZNG was formally renamed to Croatian Army (HV) 

Nonetheless, after successfully defending Croatia in 1991, Croatians continued to improve their army in following years by creating their own doctrine, military culture and professional troops with the main aim of retaking self proclaimed Republic of Serbian Krajina, a separatist proto-state. In 1992, HV established officers school for platoon and company commanders, as well as command/staff school for staff officers and senior field commanders. This was all later unified as Petar Zrinski HV University. In 1994, Croatian Army also established NCO school in Zadar for its all-professional Guards brigades whose main purpose was cunducting offensive operations. These brigades were as follows: 

 1st Guards Brigade - "The Tigers"
 2nd Guards Brigade - "The Thunders"
 3rd Guards Brigade - "The Martens"
 4th Guards Brigade - "The Spiders"
 5th Guards Brigade - "The Hawks"
 9th Guards Brigade - "The Wolves"
 7th Guards Brigade - "The Pumas" 

In terms of equipment, the HV also acquired more heavy weapons such as: Argentinian CITER 155 mm field guns, Romanian APR-40 rocket launchers, 21 MiG 21 fighter jets and 8 Mi-24 Hind helicopter gunships. Croatians also domestically produced their own UAVs (such as: MAH-1, MAH-2 and BL M-99 "Bojnik"), used for scouting enemy positions and guiding artillery fire. These systems were put to use in military operations in late stages of the war. According to the assessment of the CIA, based on HV performance in the late stages of Croatian War of Independence as well as Bosnian War - by the late 1995 - Croatian Army became "a premier military organization in the Balkans"; with "excellent staff planning and combined arms capabilities".

Some of the battles of from Croatian War of Independence include:
Operation Coast-91 (1991)
Battle of the Dalmatian channels (1991)
Battle of Vukovar (1991)
Battle of the barracks (1991)
Operation Otkos 10 (1991)
Siege of Dubrovnik (1991)
Operation Maslenica (1993)
Operation Medak pocket (1993)
Operation Flash (1995)
Operation Storm (1995)

Bosnian War 
In terms of Croatian involvement in Bosnian War, CIA claims that in 1992 Croatian strategy and policy towards Bosnia and Herzegovina was shaped by president Tuđman and so-called Herzegovina lobby's vision, who considered that Bosnia and Herzegovina cannot be preserved as a unified state. Tuđman apparently considered Banovina Hrvatska as legitimate and desirable model of territorial defining of Croatia.

As the war in Croatia entered a ceasefire phase in 1992, while the Bosnian War was only beginning, Zagreb sent shipments of weapons to Bosnian Croats and allowed Bosnian Croats serving in HV to bring their weapons home, where they helped forming the Bosnian Croat army Croatian Defense Council (HVO). In certain cases still nascent HVO forces were commanded and organized by HV officers for which CIA refers to them as HV/HVO.

During the 1994 and 1995 Croatia supplied Bosnian 5th Corps defending Bihać with ammunition and medical supplies by an airbridge across Serb held territory. Altogether 101 helicopter flights were organised; out of which 91 ended successfully while 10 failed. As Serb forces tightened their grip on Bihać, by the late 1994, Croatians assessed potential fall of enclave as a threat to its own strategic position and threatened to intervene in the matter. Croatians feared that if Bihać falls the Serb forces engaged in the siege would be able to redeploy to wider Karlovac area, where territory of Croatia was only ten kilometers deep before Slovenian border. In order to deter Serbs from further attacking Bihać, as well as to improve its own positions arount Knin, Croatians launched Operation Winter '94 in late 1994. As situation for Bosniak Army deteriorated in relation to Bosnian Serbs, Bosniaks asked Croatia for urgent help in July 1995, which resulted in signing of Split Agreement between Croatian and Bosnian government and established alliance between Croats and Bosniaks in the Bosnian War. CIA also assessed that Operation Storm as well as joint Croat/Bosniak offensives in autumn 1995, more than NATO's air campaign against Bosnian Serbs turned out to be decisive factor in bringing Bosnian Serbs to negotiating table and ending the Bosnian War.
Croat–Bosniak War (1992–1994)
Operation Winter '94 (1994)
Operation Summer '95 (1995)
Operation Mistral 2 (1995)
Operation Southern Move (1995)

21st Century

War in Afghanistan 
 International Security Assistance Force
 Resolute Support Mission
Croatia sent its troops to Afghanistan for the first time in 2003. This initial Croatian contingent consisted of 50 personnel, most of whom then were military policemen. As the time passed the number of Croatian troops in Afghanistan increased, along with complicity of the tasks assigned to them. Croatian troops took over tasks of mentoring Afghan National Army members, mentoring of Afghan pilots and air force technicians as well as providing security for various people and objects. In 2006, Croatian soldier Goran Špehar was wounded near Kandahar by an RPG round explosion. Another Croatian soldier was wounded in 2009 during training activities. On 24 July 2019, corporal Josip Briški of Croatian Special Forces Command was killed in a Taliban suicide attack. He was the only Croatian soldier killed in action during Croatian deployment in Afghanistan. In 2020 president Zoran Milanović announced complete withdrawal from Afghanistan after initial Croatian deployment. Last Croatian soldiers pulled out in September same year.

Kosovo 

 Kosovo Force

See also
List of Croatian soldiers
History of Croatia
History of Croatian Navy
History of Croatian Air Force
Military of Croatia

References
 
Enciklopedija leksikografskog zavoda 1966–69